Mirchev is a Bulgarian masculine surname, its feminine counterpart is Mircheva. It may refer to
Konstantin Mirchev (born 1978), Bulgarian footballer 
Militsa Mircheva (born 1994), Bulgarian long-distance runner 
Svetlana Mircheva (born 1976), Bulgarian artist
Vasil Mirchev (1927–2003), Bulgarian film director
Videlina Mircheva (born 1978), Bulgarian singer-songwriter
Vladislav Mirchev (born 1987), Bulgarian footballer

Bulgarian-language surnames